The Stuttgart-Bad Cannstatt–Aalen railway, also known as the Remsbahn (Rems Railway) or the Remstalbahn (Rems Valley Railway), was  historically the main line route from Stuttgart-Bad Cannstatt via Aalen to Nördlingen. Today the designation Rems Railway only refers to the section from Stuttgart to Aalen, the Aalen–Nördlingen line becoming part of the Ries Railway (Riesbahn). Between Waiblingen and Essingen the Rems line runs parallel to the River Rems from which it gets its name. The Deutsche Bahn timetable incorporates the Stuttgart–Aalen section as part of route no. 786 Stuttgart–Aalen–Crailsheim–Nuremberg and the Stuttgart–Schorndorf section as part of route no. 790.2-3.

The line is fully electrified and the western section from Stuttgart to Schorndorf is part of the Stuttgart S-Bahn.

Route 
The line's chainage is measured from Stuttgart Bad Cannstatt station. A short distance from the station, the four tracks of the Rems line separate from the Fils Valley Railway at a flying junction. At about the same point the tracks of the Rems line are rearranged to be paired by direction of operation, with S-Bahn trains running on the outer tracks and regional and long-distance trains running on the inner tracks. The line climbs about 80 metres on its way to Fellbach. At Waiblingen station the Murr Railway branches off. From Waiblingen the Rems Railway continues as a double-track line through the Rems valley and it crosses the Haldenbach river outside Endersbach station on a round-arched viaduct. The line crosses the Rems before Urbach and follows the course of the Rems until Essingen. While the Rems flows from the south of the main valley in Essingen, the Rems line follows the main valley to the east. The course of this valley allowed the line to be built in relatively straight lines without major engineering structures. After the railway junction at Aalen station, the Rems line follows the historical course along the Kocher to Goldshöfe station. This station was originally built to serve the junction where the lines separate to the north towards Crailsheim (Upper Jagst Railway) and to the east towards Nördlingen (Ries Railway), not to serve the local population.

The line is electrified and at least two-track throughout.

History 

A railway between Stuttgart and Ulm was one of the first railways proposed in Württemberg in the middle of the 19th century. Alternative alignments via Aalen or directly via Göppingen were discussed. At first it seemed the first route, even though it was indirect, had a greater chance of being built, as it required no major climbs, in contrast to the second route. After several years of discussion it was decided to build the route via Göppingen, despite the challenge of building the line over the Swabian Alb up the Geislinger Steige. The Fils Railway was opened in 1850.

But after the first phase of the network of the Royal Württemberg State Railways was completed, the construction of a railway line to the east of the country was soon back on the agenda. The main objectives put forward for the project, originally called the Nordostbahn (“Northeast Railway") were:
 to open up the industrial sites at Gmünd (now Schwäbisch Gmünd), Aalen, its current district of Wasseralfingen and Heidenheim an der Brenz
 to create a connection with the Bavarian railways at Nördlingen

The architect responsible for planning the line, Georg Morlok examined four major variants for the route with different locations for the transition from the Neckar and Fils valley to the Rems valley. These were from west to east:
via Cannstatt and Waiblingen
 via Plochingen and Schorndorf
 via Uhingen and Lorch
 via Eislingen and Gmünd

Although the cost of crossing the mountain range was found to be least for the western variant, the total cost of the eastern variant was the lowest, because the length of track that would have to be built in the Rems valley would be considerably lower as it would share part of the Stuttgart–Ulm route. In the subsequent discussions, the requests of the cities of Waiblingen and Schorndorf for a rail connection, the smaller climbs, which would allow easier operations and the shorter route between Stuttgart and Aalen contributed to the decision to select the first variant.

From the opening of the line 

Thus, on 25 July 1861 the line opened from Cannstatt via Waiblingen, Schorndorf, Gmünd and Aalen to Wasseralfingen. This was the location of the Schwäbische Hüttenwerke, then a major state steelworks. This steelworks delivered all of its steel that was moved by rail via the Rems line until the mid-1860s. The fastest regular service at the time ran between Wasseralfingen and Stuttgart in 2 hours, 55 minutes.

The line was equipped with signalman's houses about once every kilometre and with an electric telegraph. In 1863, the second section to Nördlingen was opened (now part of the Ries Railway), connecting the Rems line to the Bavarian Ludwig South-North Railway. This was after the line crossing the border at Ulm/Neu-Ulm (now part of the Ulm–Augsburg railway), the second link built between the railways of Württemberg and Bavaria. The 3.75 km section between the border and the Bavarian town of Nördlingen was operated by the Württemberg State Railways on lease. There was a separate entrance in the Nördlingen terminus, with its own hall for the Rems Railway.

The line was initially built as a single track, but duplication was planned from the outset. It was duplicated from Cannstatt to Fellbach in 1864, Waiblingen in 1876, Schorndorf in 1899, Lorch in 1902, Deinbach in 1905, Gmünd in 1910, Unterböbingen in 1920, then Essingen, and Aalen in 1926. The Aalen–Goldshöfe line was duplicated in 1866.

On 1 May 1897, the connecting line was opened from Untertürkheim to the Rems line towards Fellbach. It opens just before the site of the current Rems line Nürnberger Straße station, creating a triangular junction between Bad Cannstatt, Untertürkheim and Nürnberger Straße. Its purpose was, together with today's Schuster Railway (Schusterbahn, then called the Kornwestheim–Untertürkheim line), to relieve Stuttgart Hauptbahnhof of freight traffic.

At the end of World War II, the German military blew up the viaduct over the Haldenbach west of Endersbach station and the bridge over the Kocher west of Aalen, so that the intervening places were only accessible via the Hohenstaufen Railway from Schwäbisch Gmünd to Göppingen on the Fils Railway. Pioneers of the U.S. Army built a temporary bridge in Endersbach, so that in August 1945 the line was accessible again. Traffic was also restored over the Kocher in Aalen during the summer of 1945.

After the Second World War
The Rems Railway was electrified, starting from Stuttgart, to Waiblingen in 1949, to Schorndorf in 1962, to Aalen in 1971 and in 1972 on the Ries Railway from Aalen to Nördlingen and Donauwörth. The line was electrified as an alternative route for traffic between Stuttgart and Munich to the line via Ulm for the Olympic Games in Munich.

From 1978 to 1981, a third and fourth track were built on the Bad Cannstatt–Waiblingen section and a flying junction was built between Fellbach and Waiblingen where the Murr railway branches off, so that in 1981 Stuttgart S-Bahn services could operate to Backnang and Schorndorf.

In 1983 and 1984 a portion of the Rheingold ran from Mannheim via Heidelberg, Heilbronn, Stuttgart and over the Rems line, continuing to Nördlingen and Donauwörth to Munich. This route was chosen for touristic reasons despite the longer travel time. The route, however, had low patronage and lacked compatibility with the reinstated InterCity system.

The electrification of the line from Goldshöfe via Crailsheim to Nuremberg in 1985 allowed trains on the Rems line to Nuremberg, which had previously been hauled by diesel locomotives, to be electrically hauled.

In the early 1980s, Deutsche Bundesbahn introduced approximately hourly expresses on the line. For the summer 1988 timetable, modernised vehicles were introduced running hourly all day. These trains ran from the summer 1989 timetable under the generic name of RegionalSchnellBahn ("regional fast rail").

In 1996, the interval between Stuttgart S-Bahn services was reduced in the peak period from 20 minutes to 15 minutes. Before its introduction, Deutsche Bundesbahn had suggested that the increase in services would require additional tracks on the section between Waiblingen and Schorndorf, which was almost at capacity with the combined operation of S-Bahn and other trains on it. However, a report by RWTH Aachen University in 1993 came to the conclusion that the planned operations could be realised by shortening signal blocks on the line and modifying Waiblingen station. Deutsche Bundesbahn agreed to implement these measures in 1993 and new signalling was implemented on the Waiblingen–Schorndorf section with the Ks-Signalsystem.

It was found that the timetable was still vulnerable to disruptions. To resolve this, a fifth track was installed in about 2000 on the section between Fellbach and Waiblingen, so that long-distance and S-Bahn trains could run from Fellbach to Waiblingen towards Schorndorf at the same time.

Simultaneously with these upgrades for passenger traffic, freight facilities were dismantled everywhere, as elsewhere in Germany at this time, and in particular the operation of small and medium-sized railway sidings and freight yards were closed. But the once large freight yard at Schwäbisch Gmünd has also now closed.

Prospects
It is planned to build two new stations in the Ostalb district. In 2016, as part of the extension of half-hourly services on workdays from Schwäbisch Gmünd to Aalen, it was decided to establish the Aalen-West station between the Hofherrnweiler district and the western industrial estate. The station is scheduled to go into operation in 2020. Schwäbisch Gmünd Ost station is to be built east of the city centre in Schwäbisch Gmünd, although its location and the timing of its opening have not been determined.

Operations

Stuttgart S-Bahn 
Lines S2 and S3 of the S-Bahn serve the Stuttgart–Waiblingen section and line S2 serves the Waiblingen–Schorndorf section.

Connections 
The S2/S3 connects at Waiblingen to Backnang (S3), at Stuttgart-Bad Cannstatt to Kirchheim (Teck) (S1) and at Stuttgart Hauptbahnhof to Herrenberg (S1), Marbach (S4), Bietigheim (S5) and Weil der Stadt (S6).

Regional transport 

From Stuttgart to Aalen Regional-Express trains operate every 30 minutes on weekdays. They stop in Bad Cannstatt, Waiblingen, Schorndorf and then all stops. The typical travel time between Stuttgart and Aalen is 63 minutes. The numbers of passengers between Schorndorf and Schwäbisch Gmünd on weekdays is 6,000–8,000 in both directions.

On working day, a pair of Interregio-Expresses run on the line, stopping in Bad Cannstatt, Schorndorf and Schwäbisch Gmünd.

Rollingstock
The carriages used in regional transport are mainly renovated Silberling carriages. Since the timetable change on 12 December 2010, Regional-Express trains at weekends largely consist of double-deck carriages built from 1994 to 1996.

Long distance 
InterCity trains run at two-hour intervals on the Karlsruhe–Nuremberg route, stopping in Stuttgart, Schwäbisch Gmünd and Aaalen. Services in the morning and evening also stop in Schorndorf.

References

Footnotes

Sources

External links 

 Timetable from 1944: S. 1, S. 2

Railway lines in Baden-Württemberg
Railway lines opened in 1861
1861 establishments in Germany
19th-century establishments in Württemberg
Buildings and structures in Ostalbkreis
Buildings and structures in Rems-Murr-Kreis
Rail transport in Stuttgart
Stuttgart S-Bahn